Lee Young-eun (born August 9, 1982) is a South Korean actress. She is best known for starring in Korean dramas such as Likeable or Not, OB & GY, While You Were Sleeping, and Can't Stand Anymore.

Personal life 
Lee married Go Jung-ho, a producer at JTBC, on September 27, 2014 at the Hotel Shilla in Seoul.

Filmography

Television series

Film

Music video

Variety show

Awards and nominations

References

External links
  
 
 
 
 

South Korean television actresses
South Korean film actresses
1982 births
Living people
South Korean Buddhists